Two ships of the Royal Australian Navy have borne the name HMAS Arunta, a name derived from the Arrernte Aboriginals of central Australia.

 , a  destroyer commissioned in 1942 which served during World War II. The ship remained in service until 1968, and sank while being towed to Taiwan for scrapping.
 , an  commissioned in 1998 and in active service as of 2020

Battle honours
Ships named HMAS Arunta have earned six battle honours:
 Pacific 1942–45
 New Guinea 1942–44
 Leyte Gulf 1944
 Lingayen Gulf 1945
 Borneo 1945
 Persian Gulf 2001–02

References

Royal Australian Navy ship names